St John Zachary (meaning "St John, son of St Zachary", i.e. John the Baptist) was a church, first mentioned in official records in 1181, within the City of London, England, on the north side of Gresham Street, Aldersgate.  Its vicar from 25 May 1424 to an unknown date was William Byngham, the founder of England's first teacher training college. It was destroyed in the Great Fire of London in 1666 and not rebuilt, with its parish being reunited with that of St Anne and St Agnes by Act of Parliament in 1670- an arrangement that lasted until the 20th century.  Its site is now a garden first made by the fire watchers in 1941. Partial records survive at IGI.

Internment
Sir Drugo Barentyn, (died 1415), Goldsmith, one of the Sheriffs of the City of London, twice Lord Mayor of London, politician, was buried there.
(N.b.: Goldsmiths' Hall).

In Film

The 2011 film adaptation of Stieg Larsson's 'The Girl with the Dragon Tattoo' directed by David Fincher used the churchyard as a filming location.

Notes

Former buildings and structures in the City of London
Churches in the City of London
Churches destroyed in the Great Fire of London and not rebuilt
10th-century establishments in England
1666 disestablishments in England